Unexpected Arrival is the debut studio album by American rapper Diggy Simmons. It was released on March 20, 2012, by Atlantic Records. Recording sessions took place from 2010 to 2011, at various locations, while the production on the album was handled by Da Internz, Osinachi Nwaneri, Pop & Oak, Happy Perez, and Soundz, among others.

Unexpected Arrival was supported by five singles; including three official ("Copy, Paste", "Do It Like You" and "4 Letter Word") and two promotional singles ("88" and "Two Up").

Upon the release, the album received generally positive reviews from music critics. The album debuted at number 13 on the US Billboard 200. On June 22, 2013, the album has sold 89,750 copies in the United States.

Critical reception 

Upon its release, Unexpected Arrival received generally positive reviews from music critics. Christian Mordi of XXL praised the album's production and Diggy's lyrical skills for coming off more like a seasoned veteran saying, "Unlike many young artists, Diggy stays away from a lot of catchy, jingle-esque hooks and songs about trends on this project. Clearly the young MC wants to be taken seriously by casual and hardcore fans alike." AllMusic editor David Jeffries also praised the album for its production and Diggy's accessibility as a rapper concluding that, "Kid-tested and parent-approved, this well-done debut makes hating on Diggy as ridiculous as it sounds." Edwin Ortiz of HipHopDX was mixed about Diggy's talent as an emcee, singling out his age and limited view on the world for the subpar content. He concluded that, "To Diggy's credit, Unexpected Arrival plays to his adolescent strengths without hindering his opportunity to build upon his brand as an adult."

Brandon Soderberg of Spin gave credit to some of the tracks, singling out "Unforgivable Blackness" for being "a sophisticated song that actually tries to confront [Diggy] Simmons’ lack of street cred," but found the rest of the album hollow and generic and followed a formula to market an underdog rapper, saying that, "Unexpected Arrival feels like the end of the rap album. The musical narrative is executed so effectively, hitting all the requisite marks, but it doesn’t matter in the least."

Track listing 

Sample credits
 "88" contains a sample from "Dance (A$$)" performed by Big Sean.
 "Do It Like You" contains a sample from "Theme From the Planets", written and performed by Dexter Wansel.

Personnel 
Credits for Unexpected Arrival adapted from AllMusic.

 John Armstrong – engineer
 Paul Bailey – engineer
 Shawn Barron – A&R
 Carlos Centel Battey – composer
 Steven Andre Battey – composer
 Cynthia Biggs – composer
 Nick Bilardello – art direction, design
 The Jackie Boyz – vocals
 Tanisha Broadwater – production coordination
 Mike Caren – A&R
 Shawn Carter – composer
 Kenneth Coby – composer
 Clarence Coffee, Jr. – composer, vocals
 Brian Cohen – composer
 Da Internz – producer
 Dernst "D'Mile" Emile – additional production, composer, executive producer, producer
 Laurie Dobbins – management
 Lanre Gaba – A&R
 Chris Galland – assistant
 Jesus Garnica – assistant
 Chris Gehringer – mastering
 Dionne Harper – marketing
 Patrick Hoelck – photography
 Sam Hook – composer, vocals
 Israel – engineer
 Alexander Izquierdo – composer
 Keith James – composer
 Jaycen Joshua – mixing
 Brandon Jones – keyboards

 Eben "Critical" Jones – engineer
 Nasir Jones – composer
 Perry Jones – composer
 John "J-Banga" Kercy – mixing
 Cara Lewis – booking
 Chris Lighty – management
 Chris Llewellyn – composer
 Daniel Luttrell – vocals
 Jacob Luttrell – composer
 Bei Maejor – composer
 Connie Makita – illustrations
 Manny Marroquin – mixing
 John Maultsby – composer
 Donnie Meadows – production coordination
 Latoya Murray-Berry – stylist
 Nathan Perez – composer
 Osinachi Nwaneri – composer, producer
 Happy Perez – Producer
 Jayson Phillips – composer
 Peter O. Phillips – composer
 The Rockstars – guitar, keyboards, producer
 Matthew Samuels – composer
 Diggy Simmons – executive producer, composer
 Skylar – engineer
 Lonnie Liston Smith – composer
 Soundz – producer
 Dexter Wansel – composer
 Pop Wansel – composer, instrumentation, producer
 David A. Willis – Composer
 Cathryn Marie - publicist

Charts

Weekly charts

Year-end charts

References 

2012 debut albums
Atlantic Records albums
Albums produced by Happy Perez
Diggy Simmons albums